Anomalepis colombia is a species of snake in the family Anomalepididae. It is endemic to Colombia and only known from the holotype collected in Caldas.

•	Based on the reexamined holotype and two additional species the Anomalepis colombia unique combination of 28-30/28-30/25-27 scales rows around the body, a rounded snout at the dorsal view, which moderately tapers in lateral view, has a total length of 170-193 mm (10 subcaudal scales, 4 supralabial and infralabial scales 363-410 middorsal scales,357-402 midventral scales) uniform light brown color on dorsal and creamish white color at ventral. This distinguishes Anomalepis colombia from the other species in the Anomalepis genus (A.mexicans, A.aspinous, and A.flavapices)( Vanegas-Guerrero et al. 2019)

References

3. Vanegas-Guerrero, Martins,A., Quiñones-Betancurt, E., & Lynch, J. D.(2019). Rediscovery of the rare Andean blindsnake Anomalepis colombia Marx 1953 (Serpentes: Anomalepididae) in the wild. Zootaxa, 4623(3), 595–600. https://doi.org/10.11646/zootaxa.4623.3.13

Anomalepididae
Snakes of South America
Reptiles of Colombia
Endemic fauna of Colombia
Reptiles described in 1953
Taxa named by Hymen Marx